Rave Down is the second EP by English alternative rock band Swervedriver. Produced and recorded by Anjali Dutt and the band,  it was released in November 1990, through Creation and A&M Records. The title track of the EP was included in the band's debut album, Raise (1991).

Background
Rave Down is the second of a string of EPs that was released in early 1990s by Swervedriver, following Son of Mustang Ford (1990) and preceding Sandblasted (1991). It was recorded and mixed at Jam Studios.

Critical reception

Andy Kellman of Allmusic wrote: "The bulldozing, bass-driven, Dinosaur Jr.-meets-Stooges onslaught continues in fine form." On the title track, he commented that "it is undeniably one of Swervedriver's all-time career highs, churning and chugging with that effortless flair they often possessed." Nevertheless, he also wrote that "B-sides are anything but afterthoughts or gap fillers," further explaining that "Afterglow" is the best of the extra material on the EP. NME critic Mary Anne Hobbs called its title track "a cyclone of wild, swollen riff machinery that sounds like it's been played with dislocated shoulder joints," and stated that the track "She's Beside Herself" is the only one [track] in which any other influence - an almost distinguished Costello-like vocal quality, oddly- is really discernible through Swervedriver's shredder-static." 

The EP was made single of the week by a heavy metal magazine, which prompted band's bassist Adi Vines to describe their style as "ethereal metal."

Track listing

All tracks written by Swervedriver.

 "Rave Down" – 5:07
 "She's Beside Herself" – 5:51
 "Afterglow" – 3:03
 "Zedhead" – 4:42

Personnel

Swervedriver
 Adam Franklin – vocals, guitar
 Jimmy Hartridge – guitar
 Adi Vines – bass guitar 
 Graham Bonnar – drums

Other personnel
 Amp Art – artwork
 Anjali Dutt – production, engineering
 Nick Taylor – additional guitar

References

External links
 

1990 EPs
Swervedriver EPs
Creation Records EPs
A&M Records EPs
Shoegaze EPs